The Romanian Ambassador in Santiago de Chile is the official representative of the Government in Bucharest to the Government of Chile.

List of ambassadors 

Chile–Romania relations

References 

 
Chile
Romania